Polarmail Ledge is a relatively flat wedge-shaped platform that rises above Communication Heights in the south part of Midnight Plateau, Darwin Mountains. At 2000 m, the feature is similar in elevation and aspect to Skilton Ledge, 1 nautical mile (1.9 km) to the east. Named in association with Richard Chapman Johnson of Nazareth, PA, radio operator involved for 16 years (1985–2001) in coordinating MARSgrams and Polarmail which have enabled personnel in Antarctica to communicate with home.

References

Ridges of Oates Land